Kundwal is a village in Dalmau block of Rae Bareli district, Uttar Pradesh, India. As of 2011, it has a population of 4,461 people, in 832 households.

The 1961 census recorded Kundwal as comprising 9 hamlets, with a total population of 1,401 people (729 male and 672 female), in 286 households and 252 physical houses. The area of the village was given as 2,146 acres and it had a post office at that point.

The 1981 census recorded Kundwal as having a population of 2,197 people, in 406 households, and having an area of 868.46 hectares. The main staple foods were listed as wheat and rice.

References

Villages in Raebareli district